The 1940 United States presidential election in Texas took place on November 5, 1940, as part of the 1940 United States presidential election. State voters chose 23 representatives, or electors, to the Electoral College, who voted for president and vice president.

Background
As a former Confederate state, Texas had a history of Jim Crow laws, disfranchisement of its African-American and Mexican-American populations, and single-party Democratic rule outside local governments in a few Unionist German-American counties (chiefly Gillespie and Kendall) of Central Texas. Since 1930 no Republicans had served in either house of the Texas Legislature, and in his two 1930s landslides Franklin D. Roosevelt had won over 87% of Texas' ballots.

Texas' rulers were highly critical of Roosevelt's decision in 1940 to replace conservative Texan John Nance Garner with liberal Northerner Henry A. Wallace on the 1940 Democratic ticket. There was also severe opposition to Roosevelt in the German counties due to his policy of all out aid to the United Kingdom and France in World War II against their ancestral homeland. This was sufficient to marginally reduce Roosevelt's margin, but the incumbent President nonetheless easily won Texas with 80.92% of the popular vote against Wendell Willkie (R–New York), running with Senate Minority Leader Charles L. McNary, with 18.91% of the popular vote.

Results

Results by county

See also
 United States presidential elections in Texas

References

Texas
1940
1940 Texas elections